The Kaiseregg is a mountain in the Bernese Alps, overlooking Schwarzsee in the canton of Fribourg. Its summit, which can be accessed by trail, is located a few hundred meters from the border with the canton of Bern.

References

External links

Kaiseregg on Hikr

Bernese Alps
Mountains of the Alps
Mountains of Switzerland
Mountains of the canton of Fribourg
Two-thousanders of Switzerland